Gogo brevibarbis is a species of catfish in the family Anchariidae. It is commonly referred to as the vaona though this name also refers to Ancharius fuscus. It is endemic to Madagascar where it is only known from the holotype, which is apparently from the Mananjary River basin.  Its natural habitat is rivers. It is threatened by habitat loss. It grows to a length of 25 cm.

References 
 
 Loiselle, P. & participants of the CBSG/ANGAP CAMP "Faune de Madagascar" workshop 2004.  Ancharius brevibarbis.   2006 IUCN Red List of Threatened Species.   Downloaded on 3 August 2007.

Anchariidae
Freshwater fish of Madagascar
Taxa named by George Albert Boulenger
Fish described in 1911